The 2022 Big East Conference women's soccer tournament was the postseason women's soccer tournament for the Big East Conference held from October 30 through November 6, 2022. The five-match tournament took place at the Maryland SoccerPlex in Boyds, Maryland for the Semifinals and Finals, while the First Round games were hosted by the higher seeded team. The six-team single-elimination tournament consisted of three rounds based on seeding from regular season conference play. The defending champions were the Georgetown Hoyas. They successfully defended their title by defeating Xavier in the final 1–0.  This is the sixth title in program history for Georgetown and head coach Dave Nolan.  All six of their titles have come in the last seven years and Georgetown has now won three straight titles. As tournament champions, Georgetown earned the Big East's automatic berth into the 2022 NCAA Division I women's soccer tournament.

Seeding 
The top six teams in the regular season earned a spot in the tournament.  A tiebreaker was required to determine the third, fourth and fifth seeds for the tournament as St. John's, Butler and Creighton all finished with fifteen points after the regular season.  After the tiebreakers, St. John's was awarded the third seed, Butler earned the fourth seed and hosting rights, while Creighton was the fifth seed.

Bracket

Schedule

Quarterfinals

Semifinals

Final

Statistics

Goalscorers

All-Tournament team

Source:

* Offensive MVP
^ Defensive MVP

References 

 
Big East Conference Women's Soccer Tournament